Aderpas lineolatus is a species of beetle in the family Cerambycidae. It was described by Chevrolat in 1858.

References

Aderpasini
Beetles described in 1858
Taxa named by Louis Alexandre Auguste Chevrolat